Edmund John Niemann (1813–1876) was a prolific and highly successful British landscape artist working mostly in oils. Nine of his paintings are held in the Wolverhampton Art Gallery.

Life and work

Niemann was born in Islington, London in 1813. His father, John Diedrich Niemann, was a native of Minden, Westphalia and was a member of Lloyd's, working in the City of London. As a young man, Edmund was employed as a clerk at Lloyd's, but he decided to devote himself to art and in 1839 settled in High Wycombe, Buckinghamshire, mostly painting out of doors. Though he especially enjoyed painting the scenery of the Thames and of the River Swale, near Richmond in Yorkshire, many other areas of the British Isles are covered in the corpus of his work.

Between 1844 and 1872, he exhibited paintings at a wide range of prestigious galleries including the Royal Academy, the British Institution, the Society of British Artists in Suffolk St, the Royal Scottish Academy, the Royal Institute, the Glasgow Institute, the Paris Salon, the Liverpool Academy of Arts and the Manchester Academy of Fine Arts. The first picture exhibited was a view "On the Thames, near Great Marlow, Bucks" – a small canvas shown at the Royal Academy in 1844.

Niemann and a number of other artists, including Edward Armitage were dissatisfied with the exclusiveness showed by the management of several leading art societies. In 1848 Niemann returned to London for the foundation of the 'Free Exhibition' held in the Chinese Gallery at Hyde Park Corner. This exhibition opened with 500 works of art including sculpture. In 1850 this became the Portland Gallery, Regent Street, and Niemann was chosen as one of the trustees and honorary secretary. The society later assumed the name 'The National Institution'.  The existence of the society was short lived with 1861 seeing the last of their exhibitions.

Niemann lived at Mount Vernon House in Hampstead in the 1850s.

His paintings are characterised by great versatility, natural colours, and visual realism, often in the romantic artistic style of J.M.W. Turner, Corot and Caspar David Friedrich. His son, Edward H. Niemann, was also a painter imitating his father's style.

Ill for a number of years in his later life, Niemann died suddenly at Brixton Hill, Surrey of apoplexy on 15 April 1876.

Works
(dates given where known)
On the Thames, near Great Marlow, Bucks, 1844
Dovedale, Derbyshire, 1847
Buckingham Street, Strand, 1854
Fishing by the Dam, 1855
Fishing Near Godalming, 1858
View of Richmond, Yorkshire, 1859
A charming view of Stapleton, 1860
Landscape near Rochester, 1860
Landscape with a view of Lincoln, 1861
Town and Vale of Ffestiniog, 1864
 Shooter's Hill Farm, Hampstead, 1866 (private collection, Holland, Michigan)
Ffestiniog, 1870
Windsor Castle from Cooper's Hill, Runnymede, 1876
Pateley Moor, North Yorkshire, 1879 (with Alfred Frank de Prades)
Pynford, Near Surrey
An Extensive River Landscape
The Morning Ride
On the Eden, near Carlisle
Bucks Damaged by Flood, Mapledurham, Berks, Morning
The Force, Richmond, Yorkshire
A View in Yorkshire
Goodrich Castle and the Wye
The Old Watermill
Mediterranean Harbour Scene
Ludlow, Shropshire
A View of Nottingham
The Elbor Rocks Looking Towards Glastonbury
View of Whitby
On the Wharfe
On the East Coast
Cranbrook, Kent
Richmond Upon Thames, 1868
Mountainous Landscape
The Golden Age
Farmhands on Horseback and Cattle at Water's Edge

References

External links

19th-century English painters
English male painters
British landscape painters
1813 births
1876 deaths
19th-century English male artists